Combined immunodeficiencies (or combined immunity deficiency) are immunodeficiency disorders that involve multiple components of the immune system, including both humoral immunity and cell-mediated immunity. 

This category includes conditions such as bare lymphocyte syndrome, as well as severe combined immunodeficiency. Combined immunodeficiencies are commonly distinguished from SCID by low but not absent T-cell function.

ICD-9 divides immune deficiencies into three categories: humoral (279.0), cell-mediated (279.1), and combined (279.2). However, ICD-10 does not include a category for cell-mediated immune dysfunction (antibody is D80, and combined is D81), thus grouping T-cell mediated conditions with combined conditions.

References

External links 

Combined T and B–cell immunodeficiencies